

History

Club Culture

Juncos Broncos

AFAPR Sub-23
It is the club's U-23 team that participates in the American Football League of Puerto Rico 2nd division of Puerto Rican American football league pyramid, its goal is to develop players with potential so that they can eventually make the jump to either the PRAFL team.

Record

Year-by-year

References

Puerto Rico American Football League teams